Akoti, Gujarat is a small village located in Bardoli Taluka of Gujarat. It is surrounded by the villages Palsod, Mangrolia, Samthan, Orgam, Kantali. Its main crops include sugar cane, rice, wheat, cotton, tuber, vegetables, bananas, peanuts.

References

See also 
List of tourist attractions in Surat

Villages in Surat district